Mashkov (Russian: Машков, masculine) or Mashkova (Russian: Машкова, feminine) is a Russian surname that may refer to the following notable people:
Anatoly Mashkov (born 1944), Soviet speed skater
Diana Mashkova (born 1977), Russian journalist, writer and author
 Ilya Mashkov (1881–1944), Russian artist
 Ivan Mashkov (1867–1945), Russian architect and preservationist
 Roman Mashkov (1922–1971), commander of an intelligence platoon in World War II, Hero of the Soviet Union
 Tatyana Mashkova (born 1983), Kazakhstani beach volleyball player
 Vladimir Mashkov (born 1963), Russian actor

Russian-language surnames